Colin C. Hutton (May 1926 – 3 February 2017) was an English rugby union, and professional rugby league footballer who played in the 1940s and 1950s, and coached rugby league in the 1950s, 1960s and 1970s.

Background
Colin Hutton was born in  Prescot, Lancashire, England, and he died aged 90 in Kingston upon Hull, East Riding of Yorkshire, England.

Playing career

Widnes
Hutton joined Widnes in 1945 and remained with the club until 1951, during this period he made 131 appearances scoring 16 tries and kicking 167 goals.

During the period 1947–1949 Hutton was missing from the club due to National Service. Hutton was a Lance corporal in the Royal Engineers, and served near the Suez Canal at RAF Fayid, near Ismaïlia, Egypt from 1947 until 1949, during which time he played at representative level for the army in Egypt at rugby union as the British armed forces did not at this time support rugby league as an organised sport.

On his return from National Service Hutton resumed his playing career and played in the 1950 Challenge Cup Final at Wembley Stadium in Widnes' 0–19 defeat by Warrington.

Hull F.C.
In 1951 Hutton moved to Hull F.C. where he played for a further six years before retiring from his playing career in 1957.  He made over 250 appearances for the club including scoring the winning penalty kick in Hull FC's 10–9 victory over Halifax in the Rugby Football League Championship Final during the 1955–56 season at Maine Road, Manchester on Saturday 12 May 1956.

Coaching career

Hull Kingston Rovers
After retiring from playing, Hutton crossed Hull to become coach at rivals Hull Kingston Rovers, a position he held until May 1970 by which time he had coached Rovers in 534 matches.  Included in this total were victory over Huddersfield in the Eastern Division Championship Final at Headingley  during the 1961–62 season; two winning finals of the Yorkshire Cup, the first a 25–12 victory over Featherstone Rovers in the 1966, and the following year an 8–7 victory over Hull F.C. in the 1967 competition, one Yorkshire Cup Final defeat, 2–12 to Hunslet in the 1962 Yorkshire Cup, and a Challenge Cup Final defeat in the 1964 Challenge Cup losing 5–13 to Widnes at Wembley.

Great Britain
Along with Bill Fallowfield, Hutton was the Great Britain coach for the victorious  1962 Ashes series where Britain beat Australia 2–1 in the three match series and the 1968 Rugby League World Cup where Great Britain finished third, losing two of their three matches.

Later life and death
After coaching Hull Kingston Rovers, Hutton served in various roles for the club eventually becoming chairman and, from 1997 until his death, President of the club. Away from Hull Kingston Rovers he was a member of the sports governing body, the Rugby Football League Council, and was a life vice-president of the Rugby Football League having also being chairman.

Hutton was recognised by the City of Hull by being made a Freedom of the City in 2013 and by Hull Kingston Rovers who renamed the north stand at their Craven Park ground after him in the same year.

Hutton holds a unique record as being the only person to attend Challenge Cup finals at Wembley as player, coach, club director, club chairman, club president and chairman of the governing body.

Hutton died on 3 February 2017, aged 90, two days before the start of the 2017 Championship season.

Genealogical information
Hutton's marriage to Marjorie (née Ellison) was registered during second ¼ 1950 in Prescot district. They have a daughter; Susan J. Hutton (birth registered during fourth ¼  in Hull district).

References

1926 births
2017 deaths
20th-century British Army personnel
20th-century British businesspeople
British rugby league administrators
English rugby league coaches
English rugby league players
English rugby union players
Great Britain national rugby league team coaches
Hull F.C. players
Hull Kingston Rovers coaches
Royal Engineers soldiers
Rugby league centres
Rugby league fullbacks
Rugby league players from Prescot
Rugby union players from Prescot
Widnes Vikings players